Chuck Schafer (born September 10, 1963) is a former member of the Wisconsin State Assembly.

Biography
Schafer was born on September 10, 1963 in Chippewa Falls, Wisconsin. He graduated from McDonell Central Catholic High School before attending Normandale Community College and American Flyers flight school and becoming a commercial pilot. Schafer is a member of Ducks Unlimited.

Political career
Schafer was elected to the Assembly in 1996 as a Republican and was a member until 1998. He was succeeded by Larry Balow.

References

Politicians from Chippewa Falls, Wisconsin
Republican Party members of the Wisconsin State Assembly
Aviators from Wisconsin
1963 births
Living people
Commercial aviators